Arabic Rocks is the debut studio album by the Jordanian Arabic rock band JadaL, released through eka3 records in August 2009. It contains 14 songs in JadaL's Arabic Rock Style.

Track listing

References

2009 debut albums
JadaL albums